VUC may stand for:

Education
 Victoria University College, Myanmar - first and the most successful private university in Myanmar
 Vestfold University College, Norwegian university
Victoria University College of Wellington
 Voksenuddannelsescenter, Danish Adult Education Centre

Sports
VUC Den Haag, Dutch football team
Nikola Vucevic, basketball player

Technology
IBM Virtual Universe Community